Külüllü is a village in the municipality of İvanovka in the Ismailli Rayon of Azerbaijan.

References

Populated places in Ismayilli District